John Rivo Gandini (28 March 1929 - 27 July 2016) was an Australian trade unionist.

Gandini was a member of the Electrical Trades Union from 1983 to 1993, and was President of the Trades and Labor Council of Western Australia from 1988 to 1994.
In the 1950s and 1960s he was a prominent communist and ran several times for office, unsuccessfully.

References

1929 births
2016 deaths
Australian trade unionists
Place of birth missing
People from Western Australia
Communist Party of Australia members